The Centro de Investigaciones de Astronomía (CIDA) is an institution in Venezuela, founded in honour of Francisco J. Duarte in 1975 for promoting observation, investigation, experimentation, theoretical work, and dissemination of research in the field of astronomy.  It runs the Llano del Hato National Astronomical Observatory and is one of the collaborators in QUEST.

See also 
 List of astronomical societies

References

External links 
 CIDA's official web site

Astronomy organizations
1975 establishments in Venezuela
Scientific organizations established in 1975